Liburd is a surname (and, very rarely, a given name) used in the English-speaking Caribbean (and amongst the Caribbean diaspora). People with the name include:

Surname
 Anne Liburd (1920–2007), Kittitian women's rights activist; mother of Marcella Liburd
 Ingleton Liburd (born 1961), Canadian cricketer
 Javier Liburd (born 1987), Nevisian cricketer
 Marcella Liburd (born 1953), Kittitian politician; daughter of Anne Liburd
 Melanie Liburd (born 1987), British actor
 Merlin Liburd (born 1969), Nevisian cricketer
 Patrece Liburd (born 1988), Kittitian footballer
 Richard Liburd (born 1973), English footballer
 Rowan Liburd (born 1992), English footballer
 Stephen Liburd (born 1955), Kittitian cricketer
 Steve Liburd (born 1985), Kittitian cricketer
 Tanika Liburd (born 1981), Nevisian athlete

Given name
 Liburd Henry (born 1967), Dominican footballer